Strophidon is a genus of eels in the family Muraenidae. The genus has a wide distribution throughout the Pacific and Indian Oceans where they mostly inhabit the benthic zone.

Species 
There are currently 2 described species in Strophidon recognized by FishBase:

 Strophidon dorsalis 
 Strophidon sathete 
Three other species, S. dawydoffi, S. tetraporus, and S. ui, have been described but not presently accepted by FishBase.

References 

Muraenidae
Ray-finned fish genera
Taxa named by John McClelland (doctor)